Wayne Anderson (born July 16, 1968) is an American late model race car driver. Born in Wildwood, Florida, Anderson graduated from high school in 1986.  He has two championships in the NASCAR Pro-Series, which were in 1999 and 2001. Anderson also participated in the Camping World Truck Series and Nextel Cup Series, which in the Truck Series he was able to get two top-ten finishes. He also won a championship in the FASCAR. Along with his father and Alan Bruns, he created the Florida All Stars Tour. In 2001, he was able to win the Snowball Derby.

Early and personal life
Anderson, born on July 16, 1968 in Wildwood, Florida, graduated high school in 1986.

Career

Beginnings
In 1987 Anderson received the Rookie of the Year award at Bronson Speedway, as well as Lakeland Speedway. Six years later, he became a FASCAR champion, by winning at Orlando Speedworld and New Smyrna Speedway. In 1994 he finished second in point standings in United Stock Car Alliance. One year later, he finished fifth in his first NASCAR Slim Jim All-Pro Series at Nashville Fairgrounds Speedway. In 1996, he competed in all the events in the series, and won a total of one race, five pole positions, and placed second in the Rookie of the Year standings.

1997–2004
One year later, in 1997, he competed in two Truck Series events, the All-Pro Series, as well as in the NASCAR Busch North Series (now NASCAR K&N Pro Series East) and NASCAR Southwest Touring Series.  In 1998, Anderson began to race in most of the races in the Craftsman Truck Series, while racing in the All-Pro Series. In the All-Pro Series, he won the first race of the season. On the other hand, his achievements in the Truck Series were only two top-tens. During 1999, Anderson became the Slim Jim All-Pro Series champion, as well as winning the All American 400 at Nashville Superspeedway, the Governor's Cup, and he held the most wins in the series. One year later, he became Speedweeks Super Late Model champion, and had the most wins in the All-Pro Series.

In 2001, he became the All-Pro Series champion for the second time, and voted the series Most Popular driver. He was also the 2001 Snowball Derby winner. During 2002, he became the Texas Big Shot winner, as well as the Southern All Stars winner. He also participated in the American Speed Association (ASA). In 2003, he was the Speedweeks Super Late Model champion for the second time, as well as the Pete Orr Memorial winner. He also participated in the ARCA Remax Series, where he recorded one top-five and two top-ten finishes after participating in fours races. He also became the Triple Crown Champion, the Governor's Cup winner, and the Florida Sunbelt Series champion. One year later, he won the Florida Sunbelt Series championship for the second time.

2005–2010
In 2005, Anderson participated in one Nextel Cup Series event. Two years later, in 2007, he returned to the ARCA Racing Series by participating in one race. In 2010, he, along with his father and Alan Bruns created the Florida All Stars Tour.

Motorsports career results

NASCAR
(key) (Bold – Pole position awarded by qualifying time. Italics – Pole position earned by points standings or practice time. * – Most laps led.)

Nextel Cup Series

Busch Series

Craftsman Truck Series

Busch North Series

ARCA Re/Max Series
(key) (Bold – Pole position awarded by qualifying time. Italics – Pole position earned by points standings or practice time. * – Most laps led.)

References

External links
 
 

Living people
1968 births
Sportspeople from Lakeland, Florida
Racing drivers from Florida
NASCAR drivers
ARCA Menards Series drivers
American Speed Association drivers
People from Wildwood, Florida